Henry Justin Smith (June 19, 1875 – February 9, 1936) was managing editor of the Chicago Daily News.

Smith was born in Chicago, Illinois, the son of Justin A and Mary L Smith. In 1899, he married his cousin, Katherine Augusta Smith (1874–1940).  

In 1934, he published a collection of three essays titled It's The Way It's Written. The addresses were suggested as supplementary reading for any course in journalism, or as an authentic picture of the newspaper world for readers in general.

Smith died in Evanston, Illinois, of pneumonia.

References

External links
 Henry Justin Smith papers at Newberry Library

External links
 Oscar Wilde Discovers America 1882 free full text at Internet Archive.
 Oscar Wilde Discovers America 1882 public domain audiobook at Legamus.

1875 births
1936 deaths
American newspaper editors
Chicago Daily News people
Deaths from pneumonia in Illinois
Writers from Chicago
Historians of American media